Browner is a surname. Notable people with the surname include:

Brandon Browner (born 1984), American football cornerback
Carol Browner (born 1955), American environmentalist
Joey Browner (born 1960), American football safety
Keith Browner (born 1962), American football defensive end
Ross Browner (1954=2022), American football defensive end